Erotica was an adult, consumer exhibition held each November at Olympia, London, UK. A mainstream "lifestyle show" aimed primarily at women and couples, it encouraged visitors to celebrate or re-kindle their relationships with goods and services aimed to enhance their love lives. Erotica's organisers claimed that it was the world's largest lifestyle show "for freethinking adults who are comfortable with their sexuality". Erotica cancelled its 2014 show and has not taken place since.

Exhibitors, including many small- to medium-sized companies and sole traders, offered fashion, corsetry, lingerie, shoes, jewellery, art, photography, sculpture, adult toys, games, books, DVDs, furniture and romantic gifts. Popular free entertainment included stage shows that ran several times each day (produced by London's Torture Garden), Dreamboys, entertainers that wandered among the crowds, workshops and demonstrations (including glamour photography, bodycasting, and burlesque classes), and a team of NHS sexual health advisors offering free advice, condoms, and chlamydia testing. Erotica was keen to promote safe, respectful and responsible sex, and welcomed visitors of all sexual orientations – straight, gay, and transgender.

History 
Erotica's first show was at Olympia, London, in 1997 and was an annual event there every November thereafter. Erotica Manchester had its first show at the G-Mex Centre in March 2003 but ticket sales were poor in 2005 despite attempts the previous year to attract visitors by having former Conservative Member of Parliament Neil Hamilton promote the event and the organisers did not return.

Previous shows 

Erotica 2013 was held on 25–27 October 2013 at Tobacco Dock in London.

Notes

External links 

 EROTICA 2009 (LONDON PIXELS photo set)
EROTICA 2008 (LONDON PIXELS photo set)
EROTICA 2007 (LONDON PIXELS photo set)
EROTICA UK Profile

Erotic events
Conventions in the United Kingdom
1997 establishments in the United Kingdom
Recurring events established in 1997